Imre Karcsú (born 2 February 1934) is a Hungarian former equestrian. He competed in two events at the 1960 Summer Olympics.

References

External links
 

1934 births
Living people
Hungarian male equestrians
Olympic equestrians of Hungary
Equestrians at the 1960 Summer Olympics
People from Kecskemét
Sportspeople from Bács-Kiskun County